The Elmworth gas field is a Canadian natural gas field that was discovered in 1976. It began production in 2014 and produces natural gas and condensates. The total proven reserves of the Elmworth gas field are around 20 trillion cubic feet (571×109m³) and production is slated to be around 1 billion cubic feet/day (28.3×106m³).

References

Natural gas fields in Canada
Grande Prairie